Margaret Anne Ford, Baroness Ford OBE FRSE (born 16 December 1957)  is a Scottish business woman and non-aligned British peer.  She was appointed by Tony Blair as a Labour Peer in 2006, but resigned the Labour Whip in 2009 and now sits as a Crossbencher.  She is Chair of New River REIT plc and Chair of Deloitte UK Audit Governance Board.

Life
Ford was born in Saltcoats, Ayrshire, in December 1957.  The daughter of Edward and Susan Garland, she was educated at St Michael's Academy in Kilwinning and Glasgow University.  She graduated MA (Hons) in 1979 and M.Phil in 1984.

She married Christopher Derek Ford in 1982, with whom she had two children, Michael and Katharine. After a divorce in 1990, she married David Arthur Bolger later that same year.

Career 
Ford is Chair of New River REIT plc and chairs the Buckingham Palace Reservicing Challenge Board.

Ford is the inaugural Chair of Deloitte UK’s Audit Governance Board, and is a Director of Deloitte UK Oversight Board, Deloitte North/South Europe Board, and a Member of Deloitte Global Advisory Board.

She is the former Chair of STV PLC, of Grainger plc, of May Gurney plc, and of Barchester Healthcare.  Grainger was the first Company listed on the LSE which had an all female leadership team with Ford appointing women to the positions of CEO, CFO and SID.

She has also chaired Lothian Health Board, English Partnerships (now Homes England) and the Olympic Park Legacy Company (now LLDC).  In 2011, she was included in the Times newspaper Sport Power 100, entering at number 26. In 2012 she was controversially replaced as chairman of the LLDC by Daniel Moylan, a Conservative.

She has served as a non executive Director of the Scottish Prison Service, of Ofgem, Thus plc, Serco plc, Segro plc, and Taylor Wimpey plc.

Her main executive roles were at BIFU, Price Waterhouse, Scottish Homes, and as the founding CEO of Eglinton Management Centre. She sold Eglinton in 2000 and in the same year, set up Good Practice, the online publisher (which was sold to Emerald Publishing in 2015). Her last executive role was at Royal Bank of Canada as Managing Director (DCM) in the Social infrastructure Division.

Honours 
Ford was raised to the Peerage as Baroness Ford, of Cunninghame in North Ayrshire on 11 July 2006. She was appointed as an honorary member of the RICS in 2009.  In 2015 she was elected as a Fellow of the Royal Society of Edinburgh.  She was awarded an OBE for services to business and sport in 2019, and holds Honorary degrees from Napier University and the University of Stirling.

Voluntary 
Ford has been Honorary President of the charity Epilepsy Action since 2008, a Trustee of the British Olympic Association and a Councillor of the LTA. She was formerly a Chair of the STV Children's Appeal and Trustee and Chair of the Tennis Foundation, prior to its merger with the LTA in 2019.

References

1957 births
Living people
Labour Party (UK) life peers
Officers of the Order of the British Empire
People from Saltcoats
Scottish politicians
Scottish businesspeople
People educated at St Michaels Academy
Life peeresses created by Elizabeth II
Scottish television executives
Alumni of the University of Glasgow
Fellows of the Royal Society of Edinburgh